The 1955 Eastern Illinois Panthers football team represented Eastern Illinois State College—now known as Eastern Illinois University—as a member of the Interstate Intercollegiate Athletic Conference (IIAC) during the 1955 college football season. Led by Maynard O'Brien in his ninth and final year head coach, the Panthers compiled an overall record of 3–6 with a mark of 1–5 in conference play, placing sixth in the IIAC.

Schedule

References

Eastern Illinois
Eastern Illinois Panthers football seasons
Eastern Illinois Panthers football